Shadow Dance was Angela Carter's first novel, published in England by Heinemann in 1966. It was published under the name Honeybuzzard in the United States. Upon publication it was acclaimed by Anthony Burgess, who wrote that he "read this book with admiration, horror and other relevant emotions... Angela Carter has remarkable descriptive gifts, a powerful imagination, and... a capacity for looking at the mess of contemporary life without flinching."

Carter's novels Shadow Dance, Several Perceptions (1968) and Love (1971) are sometimes referred to as the "Bristol Trilogy".

References

1966 British novels
Novels by Angela Carter
Heinemann (publisher) books
Novels set in Bristol
1966 debut novels